The following elections occurred in the year 1891.

 1891 Brazilian presidential election
 July 1891 Chilean presidential election
 October 1891 Chilean presidential election
 1891 Liberian general election

North America

Canada
 1891 Canadian federal election
 1891 Northwest Territories general election

United States
 1891 New York state election
 United States Senate election in New York, 1891

Europe
 1891 Dutch general election
 1891 Norwegian parliamentary election

United Kingdom
 1891 Lewisham by-election
 1891 Paisley by-election

Oceania

New Zealand
 1891 City of Christchurch by-election
 1891 Te Aroha by-election

See also
 :Category:1891 elections

1891
Elections